Kedungwuni is a subdistrict (kecamatan) in Pekalongan Regency, Central Java Province, Indonesia. This subdistrict is famous for its confection industry center.

References 
Districts of Central Java